Moon Landing is a musical with book, lyrics and music by Stephen Edwards. The story, from an original idea and synopsis by Justin Fleming, is based on the American Space Race and the Apollo 11 spaceflight which on July 20, 1969 landed the first humans on the Moon and is seen through the eyes of Buzz Aldrin, the second man to walk on the moon.

Glenn Carter as Buzz Aldrin led the cast of the original production,  as first presented at the Derby Playhouse, UK in October, 2007. In 2008, the play was nominated for a TMA award for "Best Musical Production".

Musical numbers

Act I
Moon Shot – Company
Our President Is Totally Nuts – Grissom, Shepherd & Slayton
Beheld By The Gods – Astronauts
Thrilled, Proud and Pleased – Jan, Joan, Pat & Betty
The Sea Of Destiny – Buzz Aldrin & Goddess Of The Moon
A Monkey Could Perform This Role – Joan & Buzz Aldrin
Path Of The Gods – Slayton & Company
Me and My Friend Grissom – Slayton, Betty Grissom & Company
The Far Side Of The Moon – Mike Collins
My Reward Will Be Regret – Joan Aldrin
The Coast of Destiny – Buzz Aldrin
We Crashed Into The Moon – Aldrin, Collins & Armstrong
I Promise – Collinses, Armstrongs, Aldrins & Slayton
The Launch – Company

Act II
What Was It Like? – Journalists, Astronauts, Wives
Mystery Creates Wonder – Neil Armstrong
What Will You Do For An Encore? – Nixons, Collinses, Armstrongs & Aldrins
That One Wonderful Moment – Buzz Aldrin
The Most Hated Man In History – Pat Collins & Nixon
The Landing, Part 1 – Mission Control, Crew & Wives
The Landing, Part 2 – Armstrong, Aldrin & Company
The Melancholy of All Things Done– Dr Sparks and Buzz Aldrin

References

External links
Official web site of the show

British musicals
2007 musicals